Cat coat genetics determine the coloration, pattern, length, and texture of feline fur. Understanding how can be challenging because many genes are involved. The variations among cat coats are physical properties and should not be confused with cat breeds. A cat may display the coat of a certain breed without actually being that breed. For example, a Siberian could wear point coloration, the stereotypical coat of a Siamese.

Solid colors

Eumelanin 

The browning gene B/b/bl codes for TYRP1, an enzyme involved in the metabolic pathway for eumelanin pigment production. Its dominant form, B, will produce black eumelanin.  It has two recessive variants, b (chocolate) and bl (cinnamon), with bl being recessive to both B and b. Chocolate is a rich dark brown color, and is referred to as chestnut in some breeds. Cinnamon is a light reddish brown, but is sometimes not reddish at all.

Sex-linked orange/red 

The sex-linked Orange locus, O/o, determines whether a cat will produce eumelanin.  In cats with orange fur, phaeomelanin (red pigment) completely replaces eumelanin (black or brown pigment). This gene is located on the X chromosome. The orange allele is O, and is codominant with non-orange, o. Males can typically only be orange or non-orange due to only having one X chromosome. Since females have two X chromosomes, they have two alleles of this gene. OO results in orange fur, oo results in fur without any orange (black, brown, etc.), and Oo results in a tortoiseshell cat, in which some parts of the fur are orange and others areas non-orange. Male tortoiseshell cats are known to exist, but, as expected from the genetics involved, they are rare and often exhibit chromosomal abnormalities. In one study, less than a third of male calicos had a simple XXY Klinefelter's karyotype, slightly more than a third were complicated XXY mosaics, and about a third had no XXY component at all.

This color is known as red by breeders. Other names include yellow, ginger, and marmalade. Red show cats have a deep orange color, but it can also present as a yellow or light ginger color. Unidentified "rufousing polygenes" are theorized to be the reason for this variance.
Orange is epistatic to nonagouti, so all red cats are tabbies. "Solid" red show cats are usually low contrast ticked tabbies.

The precise identity of the gene at the Orange locus is unknown. It has been narrowed down to a 3.5 Mb stretch on the X chromosome in 2009.

Dilution and Maltesing 

The Dense pigment gene, D/d, codes for melanophilin (MLPH), a protein involved in the transportation and deposition of pigment into a growing hair. When a cat has two of the recessive d alleles (Maltese dilution), black fur becomes "blue" (appearing gray), chocolate fur becomes "lilac" (appearing light, almost grayish brown), cinnamon fur becomes fawn, and red fur becomes cream. The d allele is a single-base deletion that truncates the protein. If the cat has d/d genes, the coat is diluted. If the genes are D/D or D/d, the coat will be unaffected.

Other genes 

 Barrington Brown is a recessive browning gene that dilutes black to mahogany, brown to light brown and chocolate to pale coffee.  It is different from the browning gene and has only been observed in laboratory cats.
 The Dilution modifier gene, Dm, "caramelizes" the dilute colors as a dominant trait. The existence of this phenomenon as a discrete gene is a controversial subject among feline enthusiasts.
  A mutation at the extension locus E/e (the melanocortin 1 receptor, MC1R) changes black pigment to amber or light amber, similar in appearance to red and cream. Kittens are born dark but lighten up as they age. Paws and nose still exhibit the original undiluted color, this in contrast to other diluted colors, where paws and nose have the diluted color. This phenomenon was first identified in Norwegian Forest cats.
 Another recessive mutation at extension was discovered which causes the russet color in Burmese cats. It is symbolized as er. Like amber cats, russet cats lighten as they age.
 A modifying factor has also been hypothesized in shaded silver and chinchilla Persians whose fur turns pale golden in adulthood, due to low levels of phaeomelanin production. These cats resemble shaded or tipped goldens, but are genetically shaded or tipped silvers. This is probably related to the phenomenon known as "tarnishing" in silvers.

Tabbies
Tabby cats are striped due to the agouti gene. Their stripes have an even distribution of pigment, while the background is made up of banded hairs. Tabby cats usually show the following traits:

 M on forehead. (Visible in ticked tabby cats, but hard to discern in shaded silver/golden, and tipped cats)
 Thin pencil lines on face. (Visible in ticked tabby cats, but hard to discern in shaded silver/golden, and tipped cats)
 Black "eyeliner" appearance and white or pale fur around eyeliner. 
 Pigmented lips and paws.
 A pink nose outlined in darker pigment.
 Torso, leg, and tail banding. (Torso banding disappears in the ticked tabby.)

Agouti 

The Agouti gene, with its dominant A allele and recessive a allele, controls the coding for agouti signaling protein (ASIP).  The wild-type A produces the agouti shift phenomenon, which causes hairs to be banded with black and an orangish/reddish brown, this revealing the underlying tabby pattern (which is determined by the T alleles at the separate tabby gene). The non-agouti or "hypermelanistic" allele, a, does not initiate this shift in the pigmentation pathway and so homozygotes aa have pigment production throughout the entire growth cycle of the hair—along its full length. As a result, the non-agouti genotype (aa) is solid and has no obvious tabby pattern (sometimes a suggestion of the underlying pattern, called "ghost striping", can be seen, especially in bright slanted light on kittens and on the legs, tail and sometimes elsewhere on adults). Agouti is found on chromosome A3.

A major exception to the solid masking of the tabby pattern exists: the O allele of the O/o locus is epistatic over the aa genotype.  That is, in red or cream colored cats, tabby striping is displayed despite the genotype at the agouti locus.

However, some red cats and most cream cats show a fainter tabby pattern when they have no agouti allele to allow full expression of their tabby alleles. That is, in genetically red cats (O males and OO and Oo females) the aa does still have an effect, especially in dilute coats (when having dd genotype at the D gene locus), where the tabby pattern is sometimes not expressed except on the extremities.

Mackerel or blotched 

The Tabby gene on chromosome A1 accounts for most tabby patterns seen in domestic cats, including those patterns seen in most breeds. The dominant allele TaM produces mackerel tabbies, and the recessive Tab produce classic (sometimes referred to as blotched) tabbies. The gene responsible for this differential patterning has been identified as transmembrane aminopeptidase Q (Taqpep). A threonine to asparagine substitution at residue 139 (T139N) in this protein is responsible for producing the tabby phenotype in domestic cats. In cheetahs, a base pair insertion into exon 20 of the protein replaces the 16 C-terminal residues with 109 new ones (N977Kfs110), generating the king cheetah coat variant.

The wild-type (in African wildcats) is the mackerel tabby (stripes look like thin fishbones and may break up into bars or spots), the most common variant is the classic tabby pattern (broad bands, whorls, and spirals of dark color on pale background usually with bulls-eye or oyster pattern on flank). The classic tabby is most common in Iran, Great Britain and in lands that were once part of the British Empire and Persian Empire.

Spotted tabby 
Spotted tabbies have their stripes broken up into spots, which may be arranged vertically or horizontally. A 2010 study suggests that spotted coats are caused by the modification of mackerel stripes, and may cause varying phenotypes such as "broken mackerel" tabbies via multiple loci. If the genes are Sp/Sp or Sp/sp the tabby coat will be spotted or broken. If it is an sp/sp gene, the tabby pattern will remain either mackerel or blotched. This gene has no effect on cats with a ticked coat.

Ticked tabby 
The Ticked (Ti) locus on chromosome B1 controls the generation of ticked coats, a non-patterned agouti coat having virtually no stripes or bars but still considered a tabby coat. Ticked tabbies are rare in the random-bred population, but fixed in certain breeds such as the Abyssinian and Singapura. TiA is the dominant allele that produces ticked coats; Ti+ is the recessive one. The causative gene for ticked tabby markings is Dickkopf-related protein 4 (DKK4). Two different alleles are responsible for the TiA ticked tabby phenotype: a cysteine to tyrosine substitution at residue 63 (C63Y) and an alanine to valine substitution at residue 18 (A18V). Both variants are present in the Abyssinian breed, and the A18V variant is found in the Burmese breed. Stripes often remain to some extent on the face, tail, legs, and sometimes the chest ("bleeding through"). Traditionally, this has been thought to happen in heterozygotes (TiATi+) but be nearly or completely nonexistent in homozygotes (TiATiA). The ticked tabby allele is epistatic to and therefore completely (or mostly) masks all the other tabby alleles, “hiding” the patterns they would otherwise express.

It was once thought that TiA was an allele of the Tabby gene, called Ta, dominant to all other alleles at the locus.

Other genes 

 Other genes (pattern modifier genes) are theorized to be responsible for creating various type of spotting patterns, many of which are variations on a basic mackerel or classic pattern.  There are also hypothetical factors which affect the timing and frequency of the agouti shift, affecting agouti band width and the number and quality of alternating bands of eumelanin and phaeomelanin on individual hairs.
 There is a gene not yet identified, but believed to be related to the agouti gene in the Chausie breed that produces silver-tipped black fur similar to Abyssinian ticked fur, known as "grizzled." This phenomenon is purported to have been inherited from the hybridization of the domestic cat to the jungle cat (Felis chaus).
 The inhibited pigment gene, I/i. The dominant allele (I) produces tipped hairs that are fully colored only at the tip and have a white base. This allele appears to interact with other genes to produce various degrees of tipping, ranging from deeply tipped silver tabby to lightly tipped shaded silver and chinchilla silver.  The inhibitor gene interacts with the non-agouti genotype (I-aa) to produce the color known as smoke. The homozygous recessive genotype when combined with the agouti gene (iiA-), produces tabby coloration, which can vary along a spectrum ranging from a deeply patterned brown tabby, to a lighter "golden tabby", to the very lightly colored shaded or chinchilla golden colors. Orange cats with the inhibitor gene (I-O-) are commonly called "cameo".

Tortoiseshells and calicos 
Tortoiseshells have patches of orange fur (pheomelanin based) and black or brown (eumelanin based) fur, caused by X-inactivation. Because this requires two X chromosomes, the vast majority of tortoiseshells are female, with approximately 1 in 3,000 being male. Male tortoiseshells can occur as a result of chromosomal abnormalities such as Klinefelter syndrome, by mosaicism, or by a phenomenon known as chimerism, where two early stage embryos are merged into a single kitten.

Tortoiseshells with a relatively small amount of white spotting are known as "tortoiseshell and white", while those with a larger amount are known in North America as calicos. Calicos are also known as tricolor cats, mi-ke (meaning "triple fur") in Japanese, and lapjeskat (meaning "patches cat") in Dutch. The factor that distinguishes tortoiseshell from calico is the pattern of eumelanin and pheomelanin, which is partly dependent on the amount of white, due to an effect of the white spotting gene on the general distribution of melanin. A cat which has both an orange and non-orange gene, Oo, and little to no white spotting, will present with a mottled blend of red/cream and black/blue, reminiscent of tortoiseshell material, and is called a tortoiseshell cat. An Oo cat with a large amount of white will have bigger, clearly defined patches of red/cream and black/blue, and is called a calico. With intermediate amounts of white, a cat may exhibit a calico pattern, a tortie pattern, or something in between, depending on other epigenetic factors. Diluted calico cats with lighter coloration are sometimes called calimanco or clouded tiger.

A true tricolor must consist of three colors: white, a red-based color like ginger or cream, and black-based color like black or blue. Tricolor should not be mistaken for the natural gradations in a tabby pattern. The shades which are present in the pale bands of a tabby are not considered to constitute a separate color.

Variations 

 The basic tortoiseshell pattern has several different colors depending on the color of the eumelanin (the B locus), and dilution (the D locus). 
 Tortoiseshell tabbies, also known as torbies, display tabby patterning on both colors. Calico tabbies are also called calibys or tabicos.

White spotting and epistatic white 

White spotting and epistatic white (also known as dominant white) were long thought to be two separate genes, but in fact they are both on the KIT gene. White spotting can take many forms, from a small spot of white to the mostly-white pattern of the Turkish Van, while epistatic white produces a fully white cat. The Birman-specific recessive "gloving" trait is also located on the KIT gene.
 WD = dominant white, linked to blue eyes and deafness. The deafness is due to a reduction in the population and survival of melanoblast stem cells, which in addition to creating pigment-producing cells, develop into a variety of neurological cell types. White cats with one or two blue eyes have a particularly high likelihood of being deaf.
 WS = white spotting. It exhibits codominance and variable expression; heterozygous cats have somewhere between 0-50% white, and homozygous cats have between 50 and 100% white.
 w = wild type, no white spotting.
 wg = recessive Birman white gloving allele.

WD causes congenital sensorineural deafness in cats. Domesticated WD cats are often completely deaf.

Colorpoint and albinism 

The colorpoint pattern is most commonly associated with Siamese cats, but may also appear in any domesticated cat. A colorpointed cat has dark colors on the face, ears, feet, and tail, with a lighter version of the same color on the rest of the body, and possibly some white. The exact name of the colorpoint pattern depends on the actual color. A few examples are seal points (dark brown to black), chocolate points (warm, lighter brown), blue points (gray), lilac or frost points (silvery gray-pink), red or flame points (orange), and tortie (tortoiseshell mottling) points. This pattern is the result of a temperature sensitive mutation in one of the enzymes in the metabolic pathway from tyrosine to pigment, such as melanin; thus, little or no pigment is produced except in the extremities or points where the skin is slightly cooler. For this reason, colorpointed cats tend to darken with age as bodily temperature drops; also, the fur over a significant injury may sometimes darken or lighten as a result of temperature change. More specifically, the albino locus contains the gene TYR.

Although the Siamese colorpoint pattern is the most famous coloration produced by TYR, there are color mutations at the locus. C is the wildtype allele resulting in full pigmentation and is completely dominant to all other known alleles at the locus. cs is the allele associated with the Siamese colorpoint pattern. cb is an allele most associated with Burmese cats and produces a pattern similar to the Siamese colorpoint, but with a much lower contrast. This phenotype is known as sepia. cs and cb are codominant, with cb/cs cats having an intermediate phenotype termed mink. c and c2 are two synonymous alleles recessive to all other alleles at the locus that cause albinism. cm is a novel mutation in Burmese cats that results in a color pattern named mocha. Its interactions with other alleles have not yet been fully established.

The tyrosine pathway also produces neurotransmitters, thus mutations in the early parts of that pathway may affect not only pigment, but also neurological development. This results in a higher frequency of cross-eyes among colorpointed cats, as well as the high frequency of cross-eyes in white tigers.

Two distinct alleles causing blue-eyed and pink-eyed albinism respectively have been previously theorized.

Silver and golden series 

The silver series is caused by the Melanin inhibitor gene I/i. The dominant form causes melanin production to be suppressed, but it affects phaeomelanin (red pigment) much more than eumelanin (black or brown pigment). On tabbies, this turns the background a sparkling silver color while leaving the stripe color intact, making a silver tabby. On solid cats, it turns the base of the hair pale, making them silver smoke.

Silver agouti cats can have a range of phenotypes, from silver tabby, to silver shaded (under half the hair is pigmented), to tipped silver/chinchilla (only the very tip of the hair is pigmented). This seems to be affected by hypothetical wide band factors, which make the silver band at the base of the hair wider. Breeders often notate wide band as a single gene Wb/wb, but it is most likely a polygenic trait.

If a cat has the wide band trait but no inhibitor, the band will be golden instead of silver. These cats are known as golden tabbies. Shaded golden and tipped golden are also possible. However, there is no golden smoke, because the combination of wide band and nonagouti simply produces a solid cat.

The genetics involved in producing the ideal tabby, shaded, or smoke cat is complex.  Not only are there many interacting genes, but genes sometimes do not express themselves fully, or conflict with one another.  For example, the melanin inhibitor gene in some instances does not block pigment, resulting in a grayer undercoat, or in tarnishing (yellowish or rusty fur). The greyer undercoat is less desirable to fanciers.

Likewise, poorly-expressed non-agouti or over-expression of melanin inhibitor will cause a pale, washed out black smoke. Various polygenes (sets of related genes), epigenetic factors, or modifier genes, as yet unidentified, are believed to result in different phenotypes of coloration, some deemed more desirable than others by fanciers.

Tipped or shaded cats 
The genetic influences on tipped or shaded cats are:
 Agouti gene.
 Tabby pattern genes (such as Ta masking the tabby pattern).
 Silver/melanin inhibitor gene.
 Factors affecting the number and width of bands of color on each hair (such as the hypothetical wide band gene).
 Factors affecting the amount and quality of eumelanin and/or phaeomelanin pigment expression (such as theorized rufousing factors)
 Genes causing sparkling appearance (such as glitter in the Bengal, satin in the Tennessee Rex, grizzle in the Chausie).
 Factors to clear up residual striping (hypothetical Chaos, Confusion, Unconfused, Erase, and Roan factors).

Fever coat
Fever coat is an effect known in domestic cats, where a pregnant female cat has a fever or is stressed, causing her unborn kittens' fur to develop a silver-type color (silver-grey, cream, or reddish) rather than what the kitten's genetics would normally cause. After birth, over some weeks the silver fur is replaced naturally by fur colors according to the kitten's genetics.

Fur length and texture 

Cat fur length is governed by the Length gene in which the dominant form, L, codes for short hair, and the recessive l codes for long hair. In the longhaired cat, the transition from anagen (hair growth) to catagen (cessation of hair growth) is delayed due to this mutation. A rare recessive shorthair gene has been observed in some lines of Persian cat (silvers) where two longhaired parents have produced shorthaired offspring.

The Length gene has been identified as the fibroblast growth factor 5 (FGF5) gene. The dominant allele codes for the short coat is seen in most cats. Long coats are coded for by at least four different recessively inherited mutations, the alleles of which have been identified. The most ubiquitous is found in most or all long haired breeds while the remaining three are found only in Ragdolls, Norwegian Forest Cats, and Maine Coons.

There have been many genes identified that result in unusual cat fur.  These genes were discovered in random-bred cats and selected for. Some of the genes are in danger of going extinct because the cats are not sold beyond the region where the mutation originated or there is simply not enough demand for cats expressing the mutation.

In many breeds, coat gene mutations are unwelcome. An example is the rex allele which appeared in Maine Coons in the early 1990s. Rexes appeared in America, Germany and the UK, where one breeder caused consternation by calling them "Maine Waves". Two UK breeders did test mating which indicated that this was probably a new rex mutation and that it was recessive. The density of the hair was similar to normally coated Maine Coons, but consisted only of down type hairs with a normal down type helical curl, which varied as in normal down hairs. Whiskers were more curved, but not curly. Maine Coons do not have awn hairs, and after moulting, the rexes had a very thin coat.

Curly-coated 

There are various genes producing curly-coated or "rex" cats. New types of rex arise spontaneously in random-bred cats now and then. Some of the rex genes that breeders have selected for are:

 Devon Rex
 Mutation in KRT71, the same gene causing hairlessness in Sphynx cats. re is an allele completely recessive to the wildtype and completely dominant to hr found in Sphynx.
 Cornish Rex
 Mutation in LPAR6. A completely recessive allele termed r.
 Ural Rex
 Mutation in LIPH.
 German Rex
 Provisionally an allele termed gr. Same locus as Cornish, but proposed as a different allele. However, most breeders consider the German Rex to have r/r genotype.
 Oregon Rex (extinct)
 A hypothetical recessive allele termed ro
 Selkirk Rex
 A dominant allele termed Se, although sometimes described as an incomplete dominant because the three possible allele pairings relate to three different phenotypes: heterozygous cats (Se/se) may have a fuller coat that is preferred in the show ring, while homozygous cats (Se/Se) may have a tighter curl and less coat volume. (se/se type cats have a normal coat.) This phenomenon may also colloquially be referred to as additive dominance.
 LaPerm
 Provisional completely dominant Lp allele.

Hairlessness 
There are also genes for hairlessness:
 h = French hairless cat, recessive.
 hd = British hairless cat, recessive.
 Hp = Russian Donskoy and Peterbald, dominant.
 hr = Sphynx cat, recessive. Identified on KRT71.

Some rex cats are prone to temporary hairlessness, known as baldness, during moulting.

Here are a few other genes resulting in unusual fur:
 The Wh gene (dominant, possibly incomplete) results in Wirehair cats.  They have bent or crooked hair producing springy, crinkled fur.
 A hypothetical Yuc gene, or York Chocolate undercoat gene, results in cats with no undercoat. However, the proportional relationship between guard, awn, and down hair production varies greatly between all breeds.
 A recessive autosomal gene for Onion hair which causes roughness and swelling on the hairs.  The swelling is due to enlargement of the inner core of medulla cells.
 A recessive autosomal gene spf for sparse fur.  As well as sparse coat, the hairs are thin, straggly and contorted and there is brown exudate around the eyes and nose and on the chest and stomach. A similar condition is linked to Ornithine Transcarbamylase Deficiency in mice.

See also

References

Further reading

External links 
Cat Genetics articles in plain English
Cat Gene Symbols
The Pigment Parade: White and White Spotting in the Cat
Inhibitor gene diagram and article

Genetics of cat coats
Cat genetics
Mutation
Animal coat colors
Animal hair